Blenniella leopardus, the leopard blenniella , is a species of combtooth blenny found in the eastern Indian Ocean from Sumatra north to the Andaman Islands. It can reach a maximum length of  SL.

References

leopardus
Fish described in 1904